Sapphire and Crystals is a collective of women artists of African descent based in Chicago, IL and founded in 1987 by ceramicist and teacher Marva Lee Pitchford-Jolly and visual artist Felicia Grant Preston. The still active collective has held group exhibitions in several galleries and community spaces across Chicago with a changing line-up of members throughout their over-30-year history. The  mission of the group was to create a network of support for black women artists and provide opportunities for them to exhibit their work. Outside of the collective, each member of Sapphire and Crystals holds an independent practice in a wide array of mediums.

History 
Sapphire and Crystals emerged during a period of many other feminist groups and artist collectives in Chicago during the 1970s and 1980s. The early planning for Sapphire and Crystals began with conversations between Marva Lee Pitchford-Jolly and Felicia Grant Preston in 1986 as response to the dissolution of the artists' former collective, Mud People's Black Women’s Resource Sharing Workshop. The name of the collective was inspired by the strength and beauty of the sapphire gemstone, as well as the negative "Sapphire" stereotype used against strong-willed black women, and the spiritual and healing properties crystals.

List of Members 
There have been over 40 members throughout Sapphire and Crystal's history, with some participating continually since the beginning and others only showing with the collective for one exhibition. 

These members include:

 Joyce Owens Anderson
 Mary Ann Abella
 Leticia Appleberry
 Stephanie Bird
Rose Blouin
 Venus Blue
 Cheryl Boone
 Simone Bouyer
 Patricia Bohannon
 Rhonda Bristol
 L’Tanya Cason (aka Akosua Bandele)
 Dorothy Carter
 Glendia Cooper
 Faith Davis
 Evelyn Davis Frazier
 Kay Dawson
 Debra Dillworth
 Jackie Duncan
 Jan Spivey Gilcrhrist
Felicia Grant Preston
 Juarez Hawkins
 Carol James
Linda James
 Renee Williams Jefferson
 Marva Lee Pitchford-Jolly
 Sheryl Jones
 Makeba Kedem-DuBose
 Annie Lee
 Lillian Morgan-Lewis
 Kathy O’Kelley
Marva Lee Pitchford-Jolly
 Monica Plott Ratcliff
 JoAnne Scott
 Patricia J. Stewart
 Shirley Sullivan
 Dorian Sylvain
 Pearlie Taylor
 Renee Townsend
Arlene Turner-Crawford
 Anna Tyler
 Beverly Warner
 Shahar Caren Weaver
 Rhonda Wheatley
 Shyvette Williams

Exhibitions 
The collective had its first exhibition, An Exhibition of Black Female Artists Working in the Chicago Area, at the South Side Community Art Center  from June 28 to July 19, 1987. Their second exhibition, Sapphire and Crystals Too, was hosted at Nicole Gallery at 230 W Huron St., Chicago, IL from February 2 - 29, 1988. 

 Wish You Were Here: Postcard Show at Wood Street Gallery, Chicago, IL
 Sapphire and Crystals Invitational at Chicago State University President’s Gallery, Chicago, IL
 Mentors, Goddesses, and Other Heroes, Chicago, IL, 2001
 Sapphire and Crystals in Black and White (a tribute to Spiral) at Concordia University, River Forest, IL, February 2004
 Sapphire and Crystals Rites of Spring at Fourth Presbyterian Church, Chicago, IL, March 2005
 Sapphire and Crystals: Black White and Blues, Chicago, IL, October 7 - November 10, 2005
 Routes to Roots, Nicole Gallery - 2009
 BEyONd Race and Gender at Noyes Cultural Arts Center, Evanston, IL, January 23 - March 12, 2009
 Sapphire and Crystals: Visions at Elmhurst College’s Frick Center - 2010
 State of G/Race: Sapphire and Crystals Celebrate 25 Years at Woman Made Gallery, November 9 - December 23, 2012
 The Divine Marva Pitchford-Jolly: Sapphire and Crystals Remember, 2013
 Sapphire and Crystals at Prairie State College, 2013
 The Way My Mama Did, BAGIT Gallery, 1996
 Diaspora Ashe, Vergie Buxton Gallery, Chicago, IL

References 

Feminist artists
African-American artists